Eyesore is a limited edition E.P. by American groove metal band Skinlab. The E.P. was released November 3, 1998. Only 5,000 copies were made.

Track listing
 "So Far from the Truth" – 4:40
 "Noah" – 4:48
 "Raza Odiada (Pito Wilson)" – 2:08
 "When Pain Comes to Surface (Demo)" – 4:31
 "Paleface (Live)" – 4:11

1998 EPs
Skinlab albums
Century Media Records EPs
Albums with cover art by Travis Smith (artist)